Chamaecrista nictitans, the sensitive cassia, sensitive partridge pea, small partridge pea or wild sensitive plant, is a herbaceous species of legume widely distributed through the temperate and tropical Americas. It is an annual plant capable of rapid plant movement—its leaflets fold together when touched.

It is similar to Chamaecrista fasciculata except that the leaves are smaller.

C. nictitans is undesirable as a forage or hay but can be used for both in subtropical areas.

References

External links

nictitans
Flora of North America
Flora of South America